Ta-Nehisi Paul Coates (born September 30, 1975) is an American author and journalist. He gained a wide readership during his time as national correspondent at The Atlantic, where he wrote about cultural, social, and political issues, particularly regarding African Americans and white supremacy.

Coates has worked for The Village Voice, Washington City Paper, and Time. He has contributed to The New York Times Magazine, The Washington Post, The Washington Monthly, O, and other publications.

He has published three non-fiction books: The Beautiful Struggle, Between the World and Me, and We Were Eight Years in Power: An American Tragedy. Between the World and Me won the 2015 National Book Award for Nonfiction. He has also written a Black Panther series and a Captain America series for Marvel Comics. His first novel, The Water Dancer, was published in 2019.

In 2015 he received a Genius Grant from the MacArthur Foundation.

Early life 
Coates was born in Baltimore, Maryland. His father, William Paul Coates (known by his middle name), was a Vietnam War veteran, former Black Panther, publisher, and librarian. His mother, Cheryl Lynn Coates (née Waters), was a teacher. Coates's father founded and ran Black Classic Press, a publishing company specializing in African-American titles. The Press grew out of a grassroots organization, the George Jackson Prison Movement (GJPM), which initially operated a Black bookstore called the Black Book. Later, Black Classic Press was established with a table-top printing press in the basement of the Coates family home.

Coates's father had seven children, five boys and two girls, by four women. Coates's father's first wife had three children, Coates's mother had two boys, and the other two women each had a child. The children were raised together in a close-knit family; most lived with their mothers and at times lived with their father. Coates has said that he lived with his father for the entirety of his upbringing, and that, in his family, the important overarching focus was on rearing children with values based on family, respect for elders and being a contribution to your community, an approach to family that was common in the community where he grew up. Coates grew up in the Mondawmin neighborhood of Baltimore during the crack epidemic.

Coates's interest in literature was instilled at an early age when his mother, in response to bad behavior, would require him to write essays. His father's work with the Black Classic Press was a huge influence. Coates has said that he read many of the books his father published.
 Coates attended a number of Baltimore-area schools, including William H. Lemmel Middle School and Baltimore Polytechnic Institute, before graduating from Woodlawn High School. He attended Howard University, leaving after five years to start a career in journalism. He is the only child in his family without a college degree. In mid-2014, Coates attended an intensive program in French at Middlebury College to prepare for a writing fellowship in Paris, France.

Career

Journalism 
Coates's first journalism job was as a reporter at The Washington City Paper; his editor was David Carr. From 2000 to 2007, Coates worked as a journalist with various publications, including Philadelphia Weekly, The Village Voice, and Time. His first article for The Atlantic, "This Is How We Lost to the White Man", about Bill Cosby and conservatism, started a new, more successful and stable phase of his career. The article led to an appointment with a regular column for The Atlantic, a blog that was popular, influential, and had a high level of community engagement.

Coates became a senior editor at The Atlantic, for which he wrote feature articles as well as maintaining his blog. Topics covered by the blog included politics, history, race, culture as well as sports, and music. His writings on race, such as his September 2012 The Atlantic cover piece "Fear of a Black President" and his June 2014 feature "The Case for Reparations", have been especially praised, and won his blog a place on the Best Blogs of 2011 list by Time magazine and the 2012 Hillman Prize for Opinion & Analysis Journalism from The Sidney Hillman Foundation. His blog has been praised for its engaging comments section, which Coates curates and moderates heavily so that "the jerks are invited to leave [and] the grown-ups to stay and chime in."
 In discussing The Atlantic article on "The Case for Reparations", Coates said he had worked on it for almost two years. He had read Rutgers University professor Beryl Satter's book, Family Properties: Race, Real Estate, and the Exploitation of Black Urban America, a history of redlining that included a discussion of the grassroots organization the Contract Buyers League, of which Clyde Ross was one of the leaders. The focus of the article was not so much on reparations for slavery, but was instead a focus on the institutional racism of housing discrimination.

Coates has worked as a guest columnist for The New York Times, having turned down an offer from them to become a regular columnist. He has written for The Washington Post, the Washington Monthly, and O magazine.

Coates left his position as a national correspondent for The Atlantic in July 2018 after a decade with the magazine. In a memo to the staff, the editor in chief, Jeffrey Goldberg, said: "The last few years for him have been years of significant changes. He's told me that he would like to take some time to reflect on these changes, and to figure out the best path forward, both as a person and as a writer."

Author

The Beautiful Struggle 
In 2008, Coates published The Beautiful Struggle, a memoir about coming of age in West Baltimore and its effect on him. In the book, he discusses the influence of his father W. Paul Coates, a former Black Panther; the prevailing street crime of the era and its effects on his older brother; his own troubled experience attending Baltimore-area schools; and his eventual graduation and enrollment in Howard University. The lack of interpersonal skills and the complexity of Coates's father figure in the book sheds light on a world of absentee fathers. As Rich Benjamin states in a September 2016 article in The Guardian, "Fatherhood is a vexed topic, particularly so for an author such as Coates" and continues with "The Beautiful Struggle makes an enduring genre cliche—the father-son relationship—unexpected and new, as well as offering a vital insight into Coates's coming of age as a man and thinker."

Between the World and Me 

Coates's second book, Between the World and Me, was published in July 2015. The title is drawn from a Richard Wright poem of the same name about a black man discovering the site of a lynching and becoming incapacitated with fear, creating a barrier between himself and the world. Coates said that one of the origins of the book was the death of a college friend, Prince Carmen Jones Jr., who was shot by police in a case of mistaken identity. One of the themes of the book was what physically affected African-American lives, such as their bodies being enslaved, violence that came from slavery, and various forms of institutional racism. The book won the 2015 National Book Award for Nonfiction and was a finalist for the 2016 Pulitzer Prize for General Non-Fiction. The book was ranked 7th on The Guardian's list of the 100 best books of the 21st century.

Black Panther 
In 2016, Coates was the writer of the sixth volume of Marvel Comics' Black Panther series, which teamed him with artist Brian Stelfreeze. Issue #1 went on sale April 6, 2016, and sold an estimated 253,259 physical copies, the best-selling comic for the month of April 2016. He also wrote a spinoff of Black Panther — Black Panther and the Crew — that ran for six issues before it was canceled. In 2018, Coates announced he would be writing a ninth volume of the Captain America series, which would team him with artists Leinil Yu and Alex Ross.

We Were Eight Years in Power 

Coates's collection of previously published essays on the Obama era, We Were Eight Years in Power: An American Tragedy, was announced by Random House, with a release date of October 3, 2017. Coates added essays written especially for the book bridging the gaps between the previously-published essays, as well as an introduction and an epilogue. The book's title is a quote from 19th-century African-American congressman Thomas E. Miller of South Carolina, who asked why white Southerners hated African Americans after all the good they had done during the Reconstruction Era. Coates sees parallels between that earlier period and the Obama presidency.

The Water Dancer

Coates's first novel and work of fiction, The Water Dancer, was published in 2019, and is a surrealist story set in the time of slavery, concerning a superhuman protagonist named Hiram Walker who possesses photographic memory, but who cannot remember his mother, and is able to transport people over far distances by using a power known as "conduction" which can fold the Earth like fabric and allows him to travel across large areas via waterways. The novel is also an Oprah's Book Club selection.

Teaching 
Coates was the 2012–2014 MLK visiting scholar for writing at the Massachusetts Institute of Technology. He joined the CUNY Graduate School of Journalism as its journalist-in-residence in late 2014. In 2017, Coates joined the faculty of New York University's Arthur L. Carter Journalism Institute as a Distinguished Writer in Residence. In 2021, Coates joined the Howard University faculty as writer-in-residence in the College of Arts and Sciences and holds the Sterling Brown chair in the English Department.

Projects 
As of 2019, Coates was working on America in the King Years, which is a television project with David Simon, Taylor Branch, and James McBride. The project is about Martin Luther King Jr. and the Civil Rights Movement, based on one of the volumes of the books America in the King Years written by Branch, specifically At Canaan's Edge: America in the King Years, 1965–1968. The project will be produced by Oprah Winfrey and air on HBO.

Coates is working on a novel about an African American from Chicago who moves to Paris.

Coates is set to adapt Rachel Aviv's 2014 The New Yorker article "Wrong Answer" into a full-length feature film of the same title, starring Michael B. Jordan with direction by Ryan Coogler.

In February 2021, it was reported that Coates had been hired to write the script of a new Superman feature film from DC Films and Warner Bros. Pictures, with J. J. Abrams producing.

Views on race in the United States
In an interview with Ezra Klein, Coates outlined his analysis that the extent of white identity expression in the United States serves as a critical factor in threat perceptions of certain European Americans and their response to political paradigm shifts related to African Americans, such as the presidency of Barack Obama.

Personal life

Coates's first name, Ta-Nehisi, is derived from an Ancient Egyptian language name for Nubia. Nubia is a region along the Nile river in present-day northern Sudan and southern Egypt.

As a child, Coates enjoyed comic books and Dungeons & Dragons.

Coates lived in Paris for a residency. In 2009, he lived in Harlem with his wife, Kenyatta Matthews, and son, Samori Maceo-Paul Coates. His son's name is a reference to three people: Samori Ture, a Mandé chief who fought French colonialism, black Cuban revolutionary Antonio Maceo Grajales, and Coates's father, who was known by his middle name of Paul. Coates met his wife when they were both students at Howard University. He is an atheist and a feminist. With his family, Coates moved to Prospect Lefferts Gardens, Brooklyn, New York, in 2001. They purchased a brownstone in Prospect Lefferts Gardens in 2016. In 2016, he was made a member of Phi Beta Kappa at Oregon State University.

In December 2017, Coates, who had a following of more than 1.25 million Twitter users, deactivated his Twitter account after a disagreement with philosopher and activist Cornel West over West's editorial in The Guardian, titled "Ta-Nehisi Coates is the neoliberal face of the black freedom struggle".

Coates caused some controversy in 2021 for his writing of Captain America, volume 9 #28, in which he depicted the Nazi super-villain Red Skull espousing the writings of the Canadian conservative clinical psychologist Jordan Peterson. Peterson stated that his work was used out of context in order to portray him negatively, describing it as an "attack" on himself.

Awards 
 2012: Hillman Prize for Opinion and Analysis Journalism
 2013: National Magazine Award for Essays and Criticism for "Fear of a Black President"
 2014: George Polk Award for Commentary for "The Case for Reparations"
 2015: Harriet Beecher Stowe Center Prize for Writing to Advance Social Justice for "The Case for Reparations"
 2015: American Library in Paris Visiting Fellowship
 2015: National Book Award for Nonfiction for Between the World and Me
 2015: Fellow of the John D. and Catherine T. MacArthur Foundation
 2015: Kirkus Prize for Nonfiction for Between the World and Me
 2018: Dayton Literary Peace Prize in Nonfiction for We Were Eight Years in Power
 2018: Eisner Award for Best Limited Series, for Black Panther: World of Wakanda (with Roxane Gay and Alitha E. Martinez)
 2020: British Fantasy Society Sydney J. Bounds Award for The Water Dancer

Bibliography

Monographs
 Asphalt Sketches (poetry). Baltimore, Maryland: Sundiata Publications, 1990. .
 The Beautiful Struggle: A Father, Two Sons, and an Unlikely Road to Manhood. New York: Spiegel & Grau, 2008.  
 Between the World and Me: Notes on the First 150 Years in America. New York: Spiegel & Grau, 2015.  
 We Were Eight Years in Power: An American Tragedy. New York: One World, October 3, 2017.

Comics
 Black Panther vol. 6 #1–18, #166–172 (2016–2018)
 A Nation Under Our Feet Book 1 (TPB, 144 pages, 2016)
 A Nation Under Our Feet Book 2 (TPB, 144 pages, 2017)
 A Nation Under Our Feet Book 3 (TPB, 144 pages, 2017)
 Avengers of the New World Book 1 (TPB, 144 pages, 2017)
 Avengers of the New World Book 2 (TPB, 136 pages, 2018)
 Black Panther vol. 7, #1–25 (2018–2021)
 Intergalactic Empire Of Wakanda Part 1 (TPB, 136 pages, 2019)
 Intergalactic Empire Of Wakanda Part 2 (TPB, 136 pages, 2019)
 Intergalactic Empire Of Wakanda Part 3 (TPB, 136 pages, 2020)
 Intergalactic Empire Of Wakanda Part 4 (TPB, 176 pages, 2021)
 Black Panther: World of Wakanda #1–6 (2016) (with Roxane Gay, Yona Harvey)
 Vol. 1: Dawn of the Midnight Angels (TPB, 144 pages, 2017)
 Black Panther and the Crew #1–6 (2017) (with Yona Harvey)
 Vol. 1: We Are the Streets (TPB, 136 pages, 2017)
 Captain America vol. 9 #1–30 (2018–2021)
 Winter in America (TPB, 152 pages, 2019)
 Captain of Nothing (TPB, 144 pages, 2019)
 The Legend of Steve (TPB, 152 pages, 2020)
 All Die Young (TPB, 144 pages, 2021)
 Free Comic Book Day Vol 2018 Avengers

Selected articles
 "Promises of an Unwed Father". O: the Oprah Magazine. January 2006.
 "American Girl". The Atlantic. January/February 2009. Profile on Michelle Obama.
 "A Deeper Black". Early, Gerald Lyn, and Randall Kennedy. Best African American Essays, 2010. New York: One World, Ballantine Books, 2010. pp. 15–22.  
 "Why Do So Few Blacks Study the Civil War?" The Atlantic. The Civil War Issue. February 2012.
 "Fear of a Black President". Bennet, James. The Best American Magazine Writing 2013. New York: Columbia University Press, 2013. pp. 3–32.  
 "How Learning a Foreign Language Reignited My Imagination: Pardon my French". The Atlantic. Vol. 311, Issue 5. June 2013. pp. 44–45
 "The Case for Reparations". The Atlantic. June 2014.
 "There Is No Post-Racial America". The Atlantic. July/August 2015.
 "The Black Family in the Age of Mass Incarceration". The Atlantic. October 2015.
 "My President Was Black". The Atlantic. December 2016.
 "The First White President". The Atlantic. October 2017.
 "I'm Not Black, I'm Kanye". The Atlantic. May 2018.

Fiction 
 The Water Dancer. One World. September 24, 2019. .

Short fiction 
 "Conduction". The New Yorker. June 3, 2019.

Multimedia
 with Richard Harrington, Nelson George, and Kojo Nnamdi. Hip Hop. Washington, D.C.: WAMU, American University, 1999.  Audio conversation recorded January 29, 1999, at WAMU-FM, Washington, D.C.
 with Stephen Colbert. "Ta-Nehisi Coates". The Colbert Report. June 16, 2014.
 with Ezra Klein. Vox Conversations: Should America offer reparations for slavery?" Vox. July 18, 2014.
 The Case for Reparations. Middlebury, Vt.: Middlebury College, 2015.  Video of lecture delivered at Middlebury College on March 4, 2015.
 with Amy Goodman. "Between the World and Me: Ta-Nehisi Coates Extended Interview on Being Black in America". Democracy Now!. July 22, 2015.
 with Jon Stewart. "Exclusive – Ta-Nehisi Coates Extended Interview" "Pt. 1" and "Pt. 2". The Daily Show with Jon Stewart. July 23, 2015.
 with Amy Goodman. Ta-Nehisi Coates: "Joe Biden Shouldn’t Be President". Democracy Now!. June 20, 2019.

References

External links

 
 Ta-Nehisi Coates at The Atlantic
 
 
 

1975 births
Living people
21st-century American essayists
African-American atheists
African-American bloggers
African-American comics creators
African-American feminists
African-American memoirists
African-American non-fiction writers
Afrofuturist writers
American atheists
American bloggers
American comics creators
American comics writers
American feminists
American male bloggers
American male non-fiction writers
21st-century American memoirists
American political writers
Atheist feminists
The Atlantic (magazine) people
CUNY Graduate School of Journalism faculty
Fellows of the American Academy of Arts and Sciences
George Polk Award recipients
MacArthur Fellows
Male feminists
Marvel Comics writers
Marvel Comics people
Kirkus Prize winners
National Book Award winners
The New Yorker people
Writers from Baltimore
American reparationists
African-American novelists
Vanity Fair (magazine) people
Culture of Baltimore
Howard University alumni
Howard University faculty